Lipp's Beach is a hamlet in Saskatchewan.

Unincorporated communities in Saskatchewan